Harold Lang (December 21, 1920 – July 26, 1985) was an American dancer, singer and actor.

Life and career
Lang began his professional career as a ballet dancer, making his professional debut with the San Francisco Ballet in 1938 and then going on to perform with the Ballet Russe de Monte Carlo two years later and American Ballet Theatre (then called Ballet Theatre) in 1943. While at ABT, he originated rôles in Jerome Robbins' Fancy Free and Interplay, in addition to performing in ballets by George Balanchine, David Lichine, Léonide Massine and Antony Tudor.

Beginning in the late 1940s, Lang moved from ballet to musical theater. He made his Broadway debut in the short-lived Mr. Strauss Goes to Boston (1945), then had more success as a soloist in Three to Make Ready (1946) and Look, Ma, I'm Dancin'! (1948). Lang's first major rôle, however, was as Bill Calhoun/Lucentio in the original production of Kiss Me, Kate (1948) — although he did not always get along with composer Cole Porter. His second major Broadway rôle was Joey in the 1952 revival of Pal Joey. Other Broadway appearances included Make a Wish (1951), Shangri-La (1956), Ziegfeld Follies of 1957, and I Can Get It for You Wholesale (1962). Lang also toured as the Jester in Once Upon a Mattress. In the long-running Kiss Me, Kate, Lang (as Bill) performed his showstopping solo number, "Bianca", and also performed "We Open in Venice" (as Lucentio) with Alfred Drake (as Petruchio), Patricia Morison (as Katharine) and Lisa Kirk (as Bianca). Lang also performed "Tom, Dick or Harry" (as Lucentio) with Edwin Clay (as Gremio), Charles Wood (as Hortensio) and Lisa Kirk (as Bianca).

Although he appeared on television in the early 1950s, Lang made no commercial films. It was reported 20th Century-Fox wanted him for the role of Vera-Ellen’s boyfriend Mike in Three Little Girls in Blue (1946) but he had to refuse because of a stage commitment in Three to Make Ready (1946). A great loss because he would have introduced the now-classic song "You Make Me Feel So Young."  His replacement was non-singer/dancer, minor-player Charles Smith (actor).

The New York Public Library has archival films of Lang's work in Fancy Free and Interplay. He also portrayed John Sappington Marmaduke "Bubber" Dinwiddie, the brother of Martha Dinwiddie Butterfield in the Patrick Dennis mock-bio First Lady. Lang is included in Ben Bagley's Jerome Kern Revisited album, singing four songs.  Both Arthur Laurents and Gore Vidal reported having affairs with Lang. From 1970 to his death in 1985, Lang was a professor of dance at California State University, Chico.

Stage appearances
Fancy Free (April 18, 1944) (Metropolitan Opera House)
Mr. Strauss Goes to Boston (September 6–15, 1945) (Broadway)
Three to Make Ready (March 7 – December 14, 1946) (Broadway)
Look Ma, I'm Dancin'! (January 29 – July 10, 1948) (Broadway)
Kiss Me, Kate (cast member from December 30, 1948 – July 28, 1950, replaced by understudy Danny Daniels when show moved to Shubert Theatre) (Broadway)
Make a Wish (April 18 – July 14, 1951) (Broadway)
Pal Joey (January 3, 1952 – April 18, 1953; 1954) (Broadway, national tour and London)
The Time of Your Life (January 19–30, 1955) (Broadway)
Shangri-La (June 13 – 30, 1956) (Broadway)
Ziegfeld Follies of 1957 (March 1 – June 15, 1957) (Broadway)
On the Town (January 15 – March 15, 1959) (Off-Broadway revival, Carnegie Hall Playhouse) (as Gabey)
Oklahoma! (1959) (Dayton, Ohio) (as Will Parker)
Once Upon a Mattress (1960–1961) (national tour)
I Can Get It for You Wholesale (March 22 – December 8, 1962) (Broadway)
Song of Norway (1963) (Warren, Ohio)
Show Boat (1963) (Milwaukee) (as Frank Schultz)
Little Me (1964) (Gaithersburg, Maryland)
No Strings (1964) (Gaithersburg, Maryland)
The Decline and Fall of the Entire World as Seen Through the Eyes of Cole Porter Revisited (1965) (Off-Broadway)
The Gershwin Years (1973) (national tour)

References
Notes

Further reading
 Bayles-Yeager, Danni (ndg)  Harold Lang: If He Asked Me, I Could Write a Book.  Canada: Trafford Publishing.

External links
 
 
 

American male ballet dancers
Ballet Russe de Monte Carlo dancers
American Ballet Theatre dancers
American male musical theatre actors
1920 births
1985 deaths
San Francisco Ballet principal dancers
California State University, Chico faculty
20th-century American male actors
20th-century American singers
20th-century American male singers
20th-century American ballet dancers